Malkhaz Zarkua (born 19 February 1986 in Zugdidi) is a Georgian freestyle wrestler. He competed in the freestyle 60 kg event at the 2012 Summer Olympics; after defeating Vasyl Fedoryshyn in the 1/8 finals, he was eliminated by Coleman Scott in the quarterfinals.

References

External links
 

1986 births
Living people
Male sport wrestlers from Georgia (country)
Olympic wrestlers of Georgia (country)
Wrestlers at the 2012 Summer Olympics
People from Zugdidi